Rhino is a JavaScript engine written fully in Java and managed by the Mozilla Foundation as open source software. It is separate from the SpiderMonkey engine, which is also developed by Mozilla, but written in C++ and used in Mozilla Firefox.

History 
The Rhino project was started at Netscape in 1997. At the time, Netscape was planning to produce a version of Netscape Navigator written fully in Java and so it needed an implementation of JavaScript written in Java. When Netscape stopped work on Javagator, as it was called, the Rhino project was finished as a JavaScript engine. Since then, a couple of major companies (including Sun Microsystems) have licensed Rhino for use in their products and paid Netscape to do so, allowing work to continue on it.

Originally, Rhino compiled all JavaScript code to Java bytecode in generated Java class files. This produced the best performance, often beating the C++ implementation of JavaScript run with just-in-time compilation (JIT), but suffered from two faults. First, compiling time was long since generating bytecode and loading the generated classes was a resource-intensive process. Also, the implementation effectively leaked memory since most Java virtual machines (JVM) didn't collect unused classes or the strings that are interned as a result of loading a class file. (This has changed in later versions of Java.)

As a result, in the fall of 1998, Rhino added an interpretive mode. The classfile generation code was moved to an optional, dynamically loaded package. Compiling is faster and when scripts are no longer in use they can be collected like any other Java object.

Rhino was released to Mozilla Foundation in April 1998. Originally Rhino classfile generation had been held back from release. However the licensors of Rhino have now agreed to release all of Rhino as open source, including class file generation. Since its release to open source, Rhino has found a variety of uses and an increasing number of people have contributed to the code. The project gets its name from the animal on the cover of the JavaScript book from O'Reilly Media. As of version 1.7R11 (May 2019), Rhino supports Java 8 and up, and supports a number of ECMAScript ES6/ES2015 features.

Use 
Rhino converts JavaScript scripts into classes. Rhino works in both compiled and interpreted mode. It is intended to be used in desktop or server-side applications, hence there is no built-in support for the Web browser objects that are commonly associated with JavaScript.

Rhino can be used as a debugger by using the Rhino shell. The JavaScript shell provides a simple way to run scripts in batch mode or within an interactive environment for exploratory programming. It can be used in applications by embedding Rhino.

A slightly modified version of Rhino 1.6r2 comes bundled with the Sun Microsystems release of Java SE version 6, which was released in December 2006. This makes it easier to integrate JavaScript as part of Java programs and to access Java resources from JavaScript. Other implementations of Java 6 may differ.

See also 

 JavaScript engine
 List of ECMAScript engines
 Nashorn (JavaScript engine) - the now-deprecated successor to Rhino for the JVM, starting at Java 8

References

External links 
 

JVM programming languages
Mozilla
JavaScript engines
Cross-platform software
Software using the Mozilla license